Näsinneula is an observation tower in Tampere, Finland, overseeing Lake Näsijärvi. It was built in 1970–1971 and was designed by Pekka Ilveskoski. The tower opened in 1971 and is located in the Särkänniemi amusement park. The design of Näsinneula was inspired by the Space Needle in Seattle. The idea of a revolving restaurant was taken from the Puijo Tower, which is located in Kuopio, the city of North Savonia.

There are two elevators, which were changed to new Kone elevators in 2020. Before the update the elevators were manufactured by Valmet-Schliren. The restaurant (called Näsinneula) is one story higher.

The elevators are still the fastest public elevators in Finland. In the event of a blackout, the tower's own diesel emergency generator will start. In an emergency, people can be evacuated with stairs that have 700 steps.

Beacon lights at the top of the tower display a weather forecast:

Gallery

See also
 Näsilinna

References

External links

 Restaurant Näsinneula
 Näsinneula – Official site
 

Towers completed in 1971
Buildings and structures in Tampere
Towers with revolving restaurants
Observation towers in Finland
Tourist attractions in Tampere